Shayah Charnam (died 1929) was a Jewish communist activist in Poland. He was killed by a plainclothes policeman in Łódź in 1929, as Charnam was organizing a workers protest meeting outside the Biderman factory. Charnam was projected as a martyr in the Polish communist movement, and songs were written about him.

References

1929 deaths
Polish communists
Year of birth missing